The 2006 Vodacom Cup was the 9th edition of this annual domestic cup competition. The Vodacom Cup is played between provincial rugby union teams in South Africa from the Currie Cup Premier and First Divisions.

Competition
There were 14 teams participating in the 2006 Vodacom Cup competition. All these teams played in a group stage, where teams would play all the teams once over the course of the season, either at home or away.

Teams received four points for a win and two points for a draw. Bonus points were awarded to teams that score four or more tries in a game, as well as to teams losing a match by seven points or less. Teams were ranked by points, then points difference (points scored less points conceded).

The top two teams in the group stage qualified for the final, where the team that finished first in the group stage had home advantage against the teams that finished second.

Teams

Changes from 2005
The two sections were scrapped and all teams were played in one single pool.

Team Listing
The following teams took part in the 2006 Vodacom Cup competitions:

Tables

Results

Round One

Round Two

Round Three

Round Four

Round Five

Round Six

Round Seven

Round Eight

Round Nine

Round Ten

Round Eleven

Round Twelve

Round Thirteen

Round Fourteen

Final

Winners

References

Vodacom Cup
2006 in South African rugby union
2006 rugby union tournaments for clubs